Khasanovo (Xäsän) is a rural locality (a village) in Aptrakovsky Selsoviet, Meleuzovsky District, Bashkortostan, Russia. The population was 221 as of 2010. There are 2 streets.

Geography 
Khasanovo is located 45 km southeast of Meleuz (the district's administrative centre) by road. Khlebodarovka is the nearest rural locality.

References 

Rural localities in Meleuzovsky District